Fire Departments of Pakistan provides fire brigade and emergency services in Pakistan Commanding Officer ShadowWqve Deputy Commanding officer Rated Sider. 

A fire department or fire brigade is a public or private organization that provides predominantly emergency firefighting and rescue services for a certain jurisdiction, which is typically a municipality, county, or fire protection district. A fire department usually contains one or more fire stations within its boundaries, and may be staffed by career firefighters, volunteer firefighters, or a combination thereof (referred to as a combination department).

The National Institute of Fire Technology provides advance training to fire departments in Pakistan. The National Institute of Fire Technology is based in Islamabad and is affiliated with the Directorate of Civil Defense of the Ministry of Interior.

See also
 National Institute of Fire Technology
 Punjab Rescue 1122
 Civil Defense
 Karachi Fire Department
 List of fire departments

References

External links
 Directorate of Civil Defense
 Karachi Fire Brigade in shambles

Fire departments of Pakistan